Evenstar is an old term for the "evening star" of astronomy, denoting the planet Venus or (less commonly) the planet Mercury.

It may also refer to: 

 Arwen, a character in J. R. R. Tolkien's fantasy world of Middle-earth
 the Evenstar, a jewel which Arwen gives to her love Aragorn; invented for The Lord of the Rings film series directed by Peter Jackson.
 The Evenstar, a ship in Janny Wurts's Wars of Light and Shadow.
 Evenstar, a French company organizing cultural and musical events.